e-akustik is the third album by Turkish rock group maNga. It was released by PASAJ/GRGDN in March 2012. Many of the songs are electroacoustic adaptations of the band's earlier works.

Track listing

References 

Manga (band) albums
2012 albums